In Greek mythology, Pterelaus (Ancient Greek: Πτερέλαος) was the son of Lelex, the pre-Hellenic king of Megara whose descendants (the Leleges) spread across Greece and beyond. Thus, he was the possible brother of Bias and Cleson.

Mythology 
Pterelaus ruled the land by the River Achelous, in the region later called Acarnania. Pterelaus had numerous sons who settled the territory in the vicinity of the Achelous, including the nearby islands of the Ionian Sea. His sons Ithacus, Neritus, and Polyctor colonized the island of Ithaca (which took the name of one of his sons) and, in addition to Ithaca itself, founded the places on Ithaca named Neritum and Polyctorium. Taphius and Teleboas were also numbered among Pterelaus's sons, and founded the Taphian and Teleboan tribes.

Notes

References 

 Apollodorus, The Library with an English Translation by Sir James George Frazer, F.B.A., F.R.S. in 2 Volumes, Cambridge, MA, Harvard University Press; London, William Heinemann Ltd. 1921. . Online version at the Perseus Digital Library. Greek text available from the same website.
Pausanias, Description of Greece with an English Translation by W.H.S. Jones, Litt.D., and H.A. Ormerod, M.A., in 4 Volumes. Cambridge, MA, Harvard University Press; London, William Heinemann Ltd. 1918. . Online version at the Perseus Digital Library
Pausanias, Graeciae Descriptio. 3 vols. Leipzig, Teubner. 1903.  Greek text available at the Perseus Digital Library.
 Strabo, The Geography of Strabo. Edition by H.L. Jones. Cambridge, Mass.: Harvard University Press; London: William Heinemann, Ltd. 1924. Online version at the Perseus Digital Library.
Strabo, Geographica edited by A. Meineke. Leipzig: Teubner. 1877. Greek text available at the Perseus Digital Library.

Kings in Greek mythology